Salique may refer to:

People
Shapla Salique (born 1974), British singer

See also
Salian Franks, subgroup of the early Franks
Salic law, major body of Frankish law during the Old Frankish Period
Terra salica, legal term used in the Salian code